Kuo Yi-hang (born 2 June 1975) formerly Kuo Shu-fen is a female weightlifter who competed for Chinese Taipei in the 2000 Summer Olympics and won a bronze medal in heavyweight category. She lifted a total of 245 kg (snatch - 107.5 kg, clean & jerk - 137.5 kg) at bodyweight  of 75 kg.

Personal life 
Kuo Yi-Hang was born in 1964 in Changzhi, Pingtung, in southern Taiwan to parents Guo Wan-Fu and Pan Jin-lian. She is the second in a family of five.

External links
Kuo Yi-Hang's profile at Sports Reference.com

1975 births
Living people
Weightlifters at the 2000 Summer Olympics
Olympic medalists in weightlifting
Olympic weightlifters of Taiwan
Olympic bronze medalists for Taiwan
Taiwanese female weightlifters
Asian Games medalists in weightlifting
Weightlifters at the 1994 Asian Games
Weightlifters at the 1998 Asian Games
Medalists at the 2000 Summer Olympics
Asian Games silver medalists for Chinese Taipei
Medalists at the 1994 Asian Games
20th-century Taiwanese women
21st-century Taiwanese women